The Saskatchewan Rush are a lacrosse team based in Saskatoon, Saskatchewan playing in the National Lacrosse League (NLL). The 2020 season is the 15th in franchise history, 5th in Saskatchewan. Due to the COVID-19 pandemic, the season was suspended on March 12, 2020. On April 8, the league made a further public statement announcing the cancellation of the remaining games of the 2020 season and that they would be exploring options for playoffs once it was safe to resume play.

On June 4th, the league confirmed that the playoffs would also be cancelled due to the pandemic.

Current standings

Game log

Regular season
Reference:

Cancelled games

Current roster

References

Saskatchewan Rush
Saskatchewan Rush seasons
Saskatchewan Rush